is a Japanese voice actor who is affiliated with Production Baobab. He is originally from Tokyo.

Voice roles

Anime television series
Arc the Lad - Elk's Father
Kenichi: The Mightiest Disciple - Kurokawa, Shimayama, additional voices
The Melancholy of Haruhi Suzumiya - Kiyosumi Morimura, Okabe-sensei, Umpire
Mobile Suit Gundam Seed - Prof. Ulen Hibiki
Naruto - Genzō
Saiyuki - Fake Gojyo
SD Gundam Force - Zapper Zaku, Gunbiker
The World of Narue - Kazuto's Father

Original video animations
I'll CKBC - Shigeru Obata

Drama CDs
Abunaii series 4: Abunai Campus Love

Dubbing
Dagon, Ezequiel (Francisco Rabal)
Dead Ahead: The Exxon Valdez Disaster, Jack Lamb (Timothy Webber)
Platoon (1998 DVD edition), Rodriguez, Tony

References

External links

Japanese male voice actors
Living people
Male voice actors from Tokyo
Production Baobab voice actors
Year of birth missing (living people)